Cavalcade is a light rail station on the Red Line of METRORail in Houston, Texas, United States. It opened on December 21, 2013 as part of the Red Line extension.

Bus connections
26 Long Point/Cavalcade

METRORail stations
Railway stations in the United States opened in 2013
Railway stations in Harris County, Texas